The 1999 Kerry Senior Football Championship was the 99th staging of the Kerry Senior Football Championship since its establishment by the Kerry County Board in 1889. The draw for the opening round fixtures took place on 20 April 1999. The championship ran from 13 June to 24 October 1999.

East Kerry entered the championship as the defending champions in search of a third successive title. An Ghaeltacht made their first ever appearance in the championship.

The final was played on 24 October 1999 at Austin Stack Park in Tralee, between East Kerry and Feale Rangers, in what was their first ever meeting in the final. East Kerry won the match by 0-10 to 1-06 to claim their seventh championship title overall and a third title in succession.

Feale Rangers' Tadhg Kennelly was the championship's top scorer with 2-17.

Results

Preliminary round

Round 1

Quarter-finals

Semi-finals

Final

Championship statistics

Top scorers

Overall

In a single game

Miscellaneous
 East Kerry became the first side since themselves in 1970 to win three titles in-a-row.
 Feale Rangers qualified for the final for the first time since 1985.

References

Kerry Senior Football Championship
1999 in Gaelic football